Mateo Leal de Ayala (1579-1627) was a Spanish army officer and politician, who served during the Viceroyalty of Peru as alcalde, teniente de gobernador and gobernador of Buenos Aires and Paraguay.

Biography 

Mateo Leal de Ayala y Medina was born in Madrid (Spain), son of Isidro Leal de Ayala and Rosa de Medina, belonging to a distinguished family of La Cabrera. He possibly studied in Spain, and settled in the Spanish Colonies of America around 1598. He was married in the city of Potosí with María Magdalena de Aguilar, a noble woman, daughter of Ginés Martínez and Leonor de Vargas.

In early seventeenth century, Ayala arrived at Buenos Aires from the Peru, and acquired a large estate of 500 rods of land, in the area of Pago de la Matanza. In Buenos Aires, he held the highest political positions, being designated the 27 of December 1613 as governor of the Río de la Plata and Paraguay. He also served as alguazil mayor of the city, and was elected alcalde in first vote of Buenos Aires in 1621.

References

External links 
todo-argentina.net

1579 births
1627 deaths
Mayors of Buenos Aires
Spanish colonial governors and administrators
People from Buenos Aires
Governors of the Río de la Plata
Río de la Plata